The Color of Olives is a 2006 political documentary film, distributed by Arab Film Distribution, produced by Daoud Sarhandi and directed by Carolina Rivas. It depicts the Palestinian family, the Amers, living in the West Bank.

The documentary was filmed in Masha, a Palestinian village 15 miles from Tel Aviv, that was separated by the West Bank wall. Hani Amer, a Palestinian farmer, refused to vacate the land his ancestors cultivated for generations, and–along with his wife and six children–became flanked by Israeli military checkpoints and barricades. The Color of Olives follows the Amers' everyday work routine and struggles; little dialogue is spoken though the family is often quoted by Rivas.

In the United States, the movie opened in New York at the Two Boots Pioneer Theater in the East Village. It was shown with English subtitles.

References

 Catsoulis, Jeannette. (2006, July 12). A Wall Runs Through It: One Palestinian Family's Tale. The New York Times, p. B7

External links 
 

2000s Arabic-language films
2006 films
Palestinian documentary films
Documentary films about the Israeli–Palestinian conflict
Documentary films about families
2006 documentary films